In 1979 an  rugby union touring team toured Japan, Fiji and Tonga.  The tourists won all their seven matches, scoring 270 points and conceding only 93. Only the first international against  was close, with Japan leading 19–15 going into injury time – a converted try by Peter Squires allowed England to win the match.

England did not award full international caps for the matches against Japan, Fiji and Tonga and the tourists played under the name of England XV rather than England in those games. The Welsh referee Clive Norling travelled with the party and refereed five of the matches. The leading tour points scorer was Huw Davies, with 60 points, and the leading try-scorers were John Carleton (9 tries) and Mike Slemen (7 tries).

The visit to Tonga was the first time that a major rugby nation had visited the country.

Matches
Scores and results list England's points tally first.

Touring party
Manager: Budge Rogers
Assistant Manager: Mike Davis
Captain: Bill Beaumont

Full back
Dusty Hare (Leicester)
Alastair Hignell (Bristol)

Three-quarters
Peter Squires (Harrogate)
Mike Slemen (Liverpool)
John Carleton (Orrell)
Paul Dodge (Leicester)
Richard Cardus (Roundhay)
Alan McMillan (Gosforth)

Half-backs
Neil Bennett (London Welsh)
Huw Davies (Cardiff)
Chris Gifford (Moseley)
Ian Peck (Bedford)

Forwards
John Scott (Cardiff)
Toby Allchurch (Durham University)
Nigel Pomphrey (Bristol)
Bob Mordell (Rosslyn Park)
Mike Rafter (Bristol)
Bill Beaumont (Fylde)
Maurice Colclough (Angoulême)
J. L. Butler (Gosforth)
Colin Smart (Newport)
Gary Pearce (Northampton)
Richard. Doubleday (Bristol)
Peter Wheeler (Leicester)
Jon Raphael (Bective Rangers)

References

Notes 

England tour
Rugby union tours of Fiji
Rugby union tours of Japan
Rugby union tours of Tonga
England national rugby union team tours
tour
tour
1979 in Asian sport